Pierre-Marie is a French masculine given name, and may refer to:

 Pierre-Marie Carré (born 1947), French prelate of the Catholic Church
 Pierre-Marie Coty (1927–2020), Ivorian Roman Catholic bishop
 Pierre-Marie Delfieux (1934–2013), French Roman Catholic priest
 Pierre-Marie Deloof (born 1964), Belgian rower
 Pierre-Marie Dioudonnat (born 1945), French publisher, historian and political scientist
 Pierre-Marie Dong (1945–2006), Gabonese film director
 Pierre-Marie Dupuy (born 1946), French jurist
 Pierre-Marie Gault de Saint-Germain (1754–1842), French painter
 Pierre-Marie Gerlier (1880–1965), French Cardinal of the Roman Catholic Church
 Pierre-Marie Hilaire (born 1965), Guadeloupean sprinter
 Pierre-Marie Lagrée (1896–1916), French soldier and serial killer
 Pierre-Marie Le Bozec (1769–1830), French naval officer
 Pierre-Marie Paoli (1921–1946), French agent in the Gestapo
 Pierre-Marie Pincemaille (1956–2018), French organist
 Pierre-Marie Poisson (1876–1953), French sculptor
 Pierre-Marie Rudelle (1932–2015), French painter
 Pierre-Marie Taillepied, Comte de Bondy (1766–1847), French politician
 Pierre-Marie Taramarcaz (born 1968), Swiss ski mountaineer
 Pierre-Marie Termier (1859–1930), French geologist
 Pierre-Marie Théas (1894–1977), French Roman Catholic bishop

Compound given names
French masculine given names